A phase shift module is a microwave network module which provides a controllable phase shift of the RF signal. Phase shifters are used in phased arrays.

Classification

Active versus passive
Active phase shifters provide gain, while passive phase shifters are lossy.
 Active:
 Applications: active electronically scanned array (AESA), passive electronically scanned array (PESA)
 Gain: The phase shifter amplifies while phase shifting
 Noise figure (NF)
 Reciprocity: not reciprocal
 Passive:
 Applications: active electronically scanned array (AESA), passive electronically scanned array (PESA)
 Loss: the phase shifter attenuates while phase shifting
 NF: NF = loss
 Reciprocity: reciprocal

Analog versus digital
 Analog phase shifters provide a continuously variable phase shift or time delay.
 Digital phase shifters provide a discrete set of phase shifts or time delays. Discretization leads to quantization errors. Digital phase shifters require parallel bus control.
 Differential, single-ended or waveguide:
 Differential transmission line: A differential transmission line is a balanced two-conductor transmission line in which the phase difference between currents is 180 degrees. The differential mode is less susceptible to common mode noise and cross talk.
 Antenna selection: dipole, tapered slot antenna (TSA)
 Examples: coplanar strip, slotline
 Single-ended transmission line: A single-ended transmission line is a two-conductor transmission line in which one conductor is referenced to a common ground, the second conductor. The single-ended mode is more susceptible to common-mode noise and cross talk.
 Antenna selection: double folded slot (DFS), microstrip, monopole
 Examples: CPW, microstrip, stripline
 Waveguide
 Antenna selection: waveguide, horn

Frequency band

One-conductor or dielectric transmission line versus two-conductor transmission line
 One-conductor or dielectric transmission line (optical fibre, finline, waveguide):
 Modal
 No TEM or quasi-TEM mode, not TTD or quasi-TTD
 Higher-order TE, TM, HE or HM modes are distorted
 Two-conductor transmission line (CPW, microstrip, slotline, stripline):
 Differential or single-ended
 TEM or quasi-TEM mode is TTD or quasi-TTD
 Phase shifters versus TTD phase shifter
 A phase shifter provides an invariable phase shift with frequency, and is used for fixed-beam frequency-invariant pattern synthesis.
 A TTD phase shifter provides an invariable time delay with frequency, and is used for squint-free and ultra wideband (UWB) beam steering.

Reciprocal versus non-reciprocal
 Reciprocal: T/R
 Non-reciprocal: T or R

Technology
 Non semi-conducting (ferrite, ferro-electric, RF MEMS, liquid crystal):
 Passive
 Semi-conducting (RF CMOS, GaAs. SiGe, InP, GaN or Sb):
 Active: BJT or FET transistor based MMICs, RFICs or optical ICs
 Passive: PIN diode based hybrids

Design
 Loaded-line:
 Distortion:
 Distorted if lumped
 Undistorted and TTD if distributed
 Reflect-type:
 Applications: reflect arrays (S11 phase shifters)
 Distortion:
 Distorted if S21 phase shifter, because of 3 dB coupler
 Undistorted and TTD if S11 phase shifter
 Switched-network
 Network:
 High-pass or low-pass
  or T
 Distortion:
 Undistorted if the left-handed high-pass sections cancel out the distortion of the right-handed low-pass sections
 Switched-line
 Applications: UWB beam steering
 Distortion: undistorted and TTD
 Vector summing

Figures of merit

 Number of effective bits, if digital [bit]
 Biasing: current-driven, high-voltage electrostatic [mA, V]
 DC power consumption [mW]
 Distortion: group velocity dispersion (GVD) [ps2/nm]
 Gain [dB] if active, loss [dB] if passive
 Linearity: IP3, P1dB [dBm]
 Phase shift / noise figure [°/dB] (phase shifter) or time delay / noise figure [ps/dB] (TTD phase shifter)
 Power handling [mW, dBm]
 Reliability [cycles, MTBF]
 Size [mm2]
 Switching time [ns]

References

External links
"Phase Shifters", Micorwaves101.com
Microwave Phase Shifter information from Herley General Microwave
 A low cost electro-mechanical phase shifter design, including a brief summary of solid state methods @ www.activefrance.com

Radar
Microwave technology